Phu Thai (Phuu Thai; Thai, Phu Thai: Phasa Phuthai, ภาษาผู้ไท or ภูไท) is a Southwestern Tai language spoken in Laos and Thailand. Although it appears different from the Isan and the Lao languages, it is spoken in areas where these languages are predominant and has been influenced by them. Comparisons of Phu Thai with other Tai languages such as Tay Khang have not yet been done systematically enough to yield convincing results.
Another aspect of Phu Thai is its contact with the Katuic languages, a branch of the Austroasiatic languages. Whether in the Phu Thai areas of Central Laos or in more recent locations of Northeastern Thailand, one can find, along with Phu Thai, a few Katuic dialects known locally as Bru, So or Katang. James R. Chamberlain (2012) focusing on anthropological issues describes “the Phou Thay – Brou relationship” as a “symbiosis” and states that “the Phou Thay – Brou relationship has never evolved into a feudal system”.

Speakers
Speakers of the Phu Thai language in Thailand numbered about 156,000 in 1993. They can be found mainly in the areas around Mukdahan, especially Khamcha-i District, Nakhon Phanom, Kalasin and Sakon Nakhon. Phu Thai speakers live as well in the Khammouane and Savannakhet Province of Laos. Some speakers have been reported in Salavan, and Champasak Provinces of Laos, in Hoa Binh province of Vietnam, and possibly also in China. There is little dialect differentiation between the varieties spoken in central Laos and in northeastern Thailand.

Speakers identified as (or identifying themselves as) Phu Thai or Phu Tai in Vietnam speak other dialects with different tone systems.

Tai Gapong or Tai Kapong found in the Nape District of Ban Nahuong, Bolikhamsai Province, Laos speak a slightly different dialect.

In Vietnam the Phu Thai are included in the group of the Thái people, together with the Thái Đen ('Black Tai'), Thái Đỏ ('Red Tai'), Thái Trắng ('White Tai'), Tày Thanh and Thái Hàng Tổng. The group of the Thái people is the third largest of the fifty-four ethnic groups recognized by the Vietnamese government.

Status
Despite its rich heritage, and regional use, in Thailand this language group is increasingly becoming integrated into the mainstream Isan language.

Phonology
The following information is of the Waritchaphum dialect:

Consonants 

 Final plosive sounds  can be realized as unreleased .

Vowels 

References

Further reading
Khanitthānan, Wilaiwan. 1977. Phāsā Phū Thai. Krung Thēp Mahā Nakhō̜n: Rōngphim Mahāwitthāyālai Thammasāt, 2520.
Miller, John and Miller, Carolyn. 1996. Lexical comparison of Katuic Mon-Khmer languages with special focus on So-Bru groups in Northeast Thailand. The Mon-Khmer Studies Journal 26:255-290.
Chamberlain, James R. 2012. Phou Thay and Brou Symbiosis. International Workshop: Peoples and Cultures of the Central Annamite Cordillera: Ethnographic and Ethno‐Historical Contributions – Towards a Comparative and Inter-Disciplinary Dialogue. Institute of Anthropology and Religion (Laos) and University of Gothenburg (Sweden), Vientiane.
Pacquement, Jean. 2015. Languages in contact: the case for Phu Thai. Presentation at SEALS 25. Payap University. Chiang Mai. DOI: 10.13140/RG.2.2.36053.73441
Pacquement, Jean. 2016. The Loeng Nok Tha, Don Tan and Chanuman (Micro-)Linguistic Area and the A Column 1-234 Split in Phu Thai (pht). Presentation at SEALS 26. Century Park Hotel. Manila.
Pacquement, Jean and Thongmany, Vanh. 2019. Phu Thai Data for Subgrouping Southwestern Tai. Presentation at SEALS 29. 貸し会議室 KFC Hall & Rooms. Tokyo.

External links
Ban Khok Kong Phu-Thai Village
In Search for the Phutais
Mo Yao : Phutai Healing
 Phutai Language : A comparative study of the Phutai in Thailand and Laos P.D.R.
โครงการอนุรักษ์และฟื้นฟูคุณค่าของภาษาผู้ไท
About Some Linguistic Variations in Phu Tai https://mekongjournal.kku.ac.th/Vol07/Issue01/02.pdf Pacquement, Jean. 2011. About Some Linguistic Variations in Phu Tai. Journal of Mekong Societies : Vol.7 No.1 January-April 2011, pp. 17-38
Multilinguisme, plurilinguisme et compétence linguistique chez les Phu Thaï du centre du Laos et du nord-est de la Thaïlande : le cas des étudiants phu thaï de l'Université de Savannakhet http://gerflint.fr/Base/Mekong4/pacquement.pdf Pacquement, Jean and Phongphanith, Sipaseuth. 2012. Multilinguisme, plurilinguisme et compétence linguistique chez les Phu Thaï du centre du Laos et du nord-est de la Thaïlande : le cas des étudiants phu thaï de l'Université de Savannakhet. Synergies Pays Riverains du Mékong n°4 - 2012, pp. 129-139
Phou Thay and Brou Symbiosis https://www.academia.edu/28104238/Phou_Thay_and_Brou_Symbiosis Chamberlain, James R. 2012. Phou Thay and Brou Symbiosis. International Workshop: Peoples and Cultures of the Central Annamite Cordillera: Ethnographic and Ethno‐Historical Contributions – Towards a Comparative and Inter-Disciplinary Dialogue. Institute of Anthropology and Religion (Laos) and University of Gothenburg (Sweden), Vientiane.
Languages in contact: the case for Phu Thai https://www.researchgate.net/publication/326668800_Languages_in_contact_the_case_of_Phu_Thai Pacquement, Jean. 2015. Languages in contact: the case for Phu Thai. Presentation at SEALS 25. Payap University. Chiang Mai. DOI: 10.13140/RG.2.2.36053.73441
Contribution à l'étude du système tonal de la langue phu thai : les tons du dialecte phu thai de Ban Phak Kha Nya https://www.academia.edu/35444426/Contribution_à_létude_du_système_tonal_de_la_langue_phu_thai_les_tons_du_dialecte_phu_thai_de_Ban_Phak_Kha_Nya_district_de_Atsaphone_province_de_Savannakhet_Laos Phongphanith, Sipaseuth. 2017. Contribution à l'étude du système tonal de la langue phu thai : les tons du dialecte phu thai de Ban Phak Kha Nya (district de Atsaphone, province de Savannakhet, Laos. PowerPoint de soutenance: Pré-mémoire de Master 1 présenté par Sipaseuth Phongphanith. Sous la direction de Joseph Thach. Consultant du mémoire: Jean Pacquement. INALCO, Paris, France. MANUSASTRA Projet international de formation à la recherche, délocalisé à la Faculté d'Archéologie, Université royale des beaux-arts, Phnom Penh.
Phu Thai Data for Subgrouping Southwestern Tai https://www.academia.edu/39910336/Phu_Thai_Data_for_Subgrouping_Southwestern_Tai Pacquement, Jean and Thongmany, Vanh. 2019. Phu Thai Data for Subgrouping Southwestern Tai. Presentation at SEALS 29. 貸し会議室 KFC Hall & Rooms. Tokyo.

Languages of Thailand
Languages of Laos
Languages of Vietnam
Southwestern Tai languages